The San Sebastián Limestone is a geologic formation in Puerto Rico. It preserves fossils dating back to the Paleogene period.

See also

 List of fossiliferous stratigraphic units in Puerto Rico

References

External links 
 

Geologic formations of Puerto Rico
Geologic formations of the Caribbean
Paleogene Puerto Rico
Limestone formations of the United States
Limestone formations